The All Thailand Golf Tour (or simply as ATGT) is the main professional golf tour played by both men and women in Thailand. All Thailand Golf Tour office is headquartered in Bangkok, Thailand. Originally the TPC Tour, it adopted the name All Thailand Golf Tour in 1999.

The tour is open to professionals and amateurs. Tournaments are generally stroke play events held over four days of 72 holes with the cut being made after 36 holes.

History
The tour began in 1999 and was advanced by the first chairman of Asian Tour, Supphaphorn Marphongphong, who further gathered more support from other professional golfers in Thailand and correspondingly became All Thailand Golf Tour's first commissioner. Boonchu Ruangkit, professional golfer, has been the Chairman of All Thailand Golf Tour Tournament Player Committee (TPC) since 1999 and is still actively involved with ATGT's development.

In 2018, the OWGR announced that the All Thailand Golf Tour would be added into the world rankings starting in 2019. A minimum of five points are awarded for a win at a 72-hole event.

2023 schedule

Schedule by year
The table below summarizes the development of the tour.

Order of Merit winners

Player exemptions
Asian Tour
 9 spots country exemption for Thai which honor from Asian Tour Rankings.
 12 spots exemption for Thailand to Asian Tour Qualifying School with 4 spots going to All Thailand Golf Tour.
 Queen's Cup: 20 spots ATGT current year rank.
 King's Cup: 20 spots ATGT current year rank.
 Panasonic Open (India) : First available player who is not otherwise exempt from ATGT Road to Panasonic event.

OneAsia Tour
 Number 1 Order of Merit ATGT receives full exemption to OneAsia Tour.
 Thailand Open: 15 spots Thai players in ATGT current year rank.

Asian Development Tour
Thongchai Jaidee Foundation – 60 ATGT players.
Boonchu Ruangkit Championship – 60 ATGT players.

Japan Golf Tour
 Panasonic Open (Japan): First available player who is not otherwise exempt from ATGT Road to Panasonic Open.

MENA Golf Tour
 Mountain Creek Open – 20 ATGT players.
 MahaSamutr Masters – 20 ATGT players

Charity fundraising
All Thailand Golf Tour has similar beliefs as other leading golf tours such as PGA Tour, European Tour and Asian Tour in providing charitable contributions for society. Overall, All Thailand Golf Tour has donated over 1,000,000 Baht since 2009 and is the only domestic golf tournament in Thailand that actively conducts charitable work.

San Funn
"San Funn" is a project where Hill Tribe children are the beneficiaries of luncheon programs, educational program and self-sustaining programs.

Golf Aids
"Golf Aids" is a project in which funds were raised in order to help relief efforts for the victim of tsunami in Japan.

References

External links
 

 
Professional golf tours
Golf in Thailand
Women's golf
Sports competitions in Thailand
1999 establishments in Thailand